The 2007 Vaahteraliiga season was the 28th season of the highest level of American football in Finland. The regular season took place between June 3 and August 26, 2007. The Finnish champion was determined in the playoffs and at the championship game Vaahteramalja XXVIII the Porvoo Butchers won the Seinäjoki Crocodiles.

Standings

Playoffs

References 

American football in Finland
Vaahteraliiga
Vaahteraliiga